Krešimir Krizmanić (born 3 July 2000) is a Croatian professional footballer who plays as a defender for Gorica in the Croatian First Football League.

Career 
Krizmanić started training football at an early age at Udarnik Kurilovec in his native Velika Gorica, before moving, at the age of 11, for a season, to NK Hrvatski Dragovoljac. The following season, he joined the HNK Gorica academy. At the age of 17, he played for the club's fourth-tier reserve team. He made his professional debut with Gorica in a 3–2 Croatian First Football League win over NK Lokomotiva on 26 May 2019.

International career
Krizmanić was born in Croatia, and was called up to represent the Croatia U21 at the 2021 UEFA European Under-21 Championship.

References

External links
 
 HNS Profile
 HNK Gorica Profile

2000 births
Living people
Footballers from Zagreb
Croatian footballers
Croatia youth international footballers
Association football defenders
HNK Gorica players
Croatian Football League players
First Football League (Croatia) players
Croatia under-21 international footballers